The Women's National Anti-Suffrage League (1908–18) was established in London on 21 July 1908.  Its aims were to oppose women being granted the vote in parliamentary elections, although it did support their having votes in local government elections.  It was founded at a time when there was a resurgence of support for the women's suffrage movement.

Origins
An anti-suffrage correspondence had taken place in the pages of The Times through 1906–07, with further calls for leadership of the anti-suffrage movement being placed in The Spectator in February 1908. Possibly as early as 1907, a letter was circulated to announce the creation of a National Women's Anti-Suffrage Association and inviting recipients to become a member of the Central Organising Committee or a member. It was issued under the names of thirty peeresses who became prominent anti-suffragists, as well as a number of peers and MPs. However, the first meeting of the Women's National Anti-Suffrage League only took place the following year on 21 July, at the Westminster Palace Hotel with Lady Jersey in the Chair. Seventeen people were nominated to the central committee at this meeting, including Mrs Humphry Ward in the chair of the Literary Committee and Gertrude Bell as secretary. Other members were Mrs Frederic Harrison (Ethel Bertha Harrison), Sophia Lonsdale, Violet Markham, Beatrice Chamberlain and Hilaire Belloc MP.

A branch of the League was formed in Dublin in 1909.

Aims
The League's aims were to oppose women being granted the parliamentary franchise, though it did support their having votes in local and municipal elections. It published the Anti-Suffrage Review from December 1908 until 1918. It gathered 337,018 signatures on an anti-suffrage petition, and founded the first local branch in Hawkenhurst in Kent. The first London branch was established in South Kensington under the auspices of Mary, Countess of Ilchester. Soon after, in May 1910, a Scottish branch was organised into the Scottish National Anti-Suffrage League by the Duchess of Montrose. By December of that year there were 26 branches or sub-branches in the country, a total which grew to 82 by April 1909 and 104 in July 1910. It was announced that 2000 subscriptions had been received by Dec 1908, rising to 9000 in July 1909.

The League's principal arguments against the concession of the Parliamentary vote to women were:

Merger
In 1910, the group amalgamated with the Men's National League for Opposing Women's Suffrage to form the National League for Opposing Woman Suffrage with Lord Cromer as president and Lady Jersey as Vice-President. The merger was in effect a takeover, with the president of the former organisation, Lord Cromer, becoming president of the new one. In 1912 Lord Curzon and Lord Weardale became joint presidents. The organisation continued its activities and the publication of the Anti-Suffrage Review until 1918 when both came to an end as women's suffrage was granted by the Representation of the People Act 1918.

Archives
The archives of the Women's National Anti-Suffrage League are held at The Women's Library at the London School of Economics.

See also
 Anti-Franchise League, formed in Australia in 1900
 Timeline of women's suffrage

References

Organizations established in 1908
Anti-suffragist organizations
Women's organisations based in the United Kingdom
1908 establishments in England
1910 disestablishments in England
Organizations disestablished in 1910